Aljamain Antoine Sterling (born July 31, 1989) is an American mixed martial artist. He currently competes in the Bantamweight division in the Ultimate Fighting Championship (UFC), where he is the current UFC Bantamweight Champion. Aljamain also competed for Cage Fury Fighting Championship, where he is the former Cage Fury Fighting Championship Bantamweight Champion. As of March 7, 2023, he is #8 in the UFC men's pound-for-pound rankings.

Background
Sterling was born in 1989 in Uniondale, New York to Jamaican parents, Cleveland and Sophia Sterling. He grew up with seven full siblings and at least 12 half-siblings. To stay away from the prevalent gang life in which some of his brothers joined, Sterling started wrestling at Uniondale High School in 2004.

Unable to catch up with the grades to reach Division I, Sterling opted to enroll at Morrisville State College where he continued wrestling. During the time in Morrisville, Sterling developed an interest in MMA when he met Jon Jones and trained on the wrestling team. After the freshman year, Sterling transferred to Cortland and eventually became a two-time NCAA Division III All-American with a record of 87–27. Sterling graduated from Cortland with a bachelor's degree in physical education. After years of absence in wrestling competition, Sterling wrestled and grappled two-time NCAA DI wrestling All-American and sophomore from Penn State Roman Bravo-Young, on December 22, 2020, at the NLWC IV. The rules consisted on six minutes of freestyle wrestling and three minutes of Brazilian jiu-jitsu. Sterling was defeated by points in the first match but tapped out Bravo-Young in the second one.

Sterling has also competed in Brazilian Jiu-Jitsu competition, defeating Damien Nitkin at High Rollerz 18 on 13th August, 2022.

He earned the nickname “The Funk Master” from his unorthodox wrestling style.

Sterling is close with teammate Merab Dvalishvili, who also fights in the UFC bantamweight division.

Mixed martial arts career
While studying in Cortland, Sterling was invited by Jones to try out mixed martial arts at his gym of that time, The BombSquad in Ithaca, New York. A few fights into his professional career, Sterling left The BombSquad and started training at Serra-Longo Fight Team.

Early career
Sterling started his amateur career in 2009 with a submission win. Prior to turning pro Sterling compiled a 6-1 amateur record with the lone loss coming by way of split decision, he would eventually avenge this loss. Sterling captured the Raging Wolf amateur Bantamweight Championship and Extreme FC amateur Featherweight Championship along the way.

Sterling started his professional career 2-0, before earning a shot at the ROC Bantamweight Championship. He would go on to defeat Claudio Ledesma by split decision to capture the title. Although this would turn out to be his last bout under the Ring of Combat organization, as he would later sign with Cage Fury Fighting Championships.

Sterling made his CFFC debut in a Featherweight bout against Evan Chmieleski. He won the fight by TKO with just two seconds left in the first round. This victory earned him a shot at the vacant CFFC Bantamweight Championship. Sterling defeated Sean Santella via unanimous decision to capture his second professional title. He would go on to defend the CFFC Bantamweight Championship on three occasions. Sterling finished all three of his title defenses by rear naked choke, which earned him the opportunity to compete in the UFC.

Ultimate Fighting Championship

2014
Sterling was scheduled to make his UFC debut at UFC 170 against Lucas Martins, replacing an injured Bryan Caraway. However Martins was eventually injured as well and replaced by fellow UFC newcomer Cody Gibson.   Sterling won the fight via unanimous decision.

Sterling made his second UFC appearance on July 16, 2014, at UFC Fight Night 45 against Hugo Viana. After controlling the majority of the fight Sterling landed a barrage of punches from the mount position causing the referee to wave off the fight late in the third round.

Sterling was expected to face Mitch Gagnon at UFC Fight Night: MacDonald vs. Saffiedine on October 4, 2014.  However, Sterling pulled out of the bout and was replaced by Rob Font.

Following a quick recovery, Sterling was promptly rebooked and was expected to face Frankie Saenz on November 8, 2014, at UFC Fight Night 55. However, Saenz was forced to withdraw from the bout and in turn promotional newcomer Michael Imperato was briefly linked as a replacement.  However, his signing was quickly rescinded and as a result, Sterling was pulled from the event altogether.

2015
Sterling was expected to face Manny Gamburyan on April 18, 2015, at UFC on Fox 15.  However, Gamburyan pulled out of the bout citing injury and was replaced by Takeya Mizugaki. Sterling won the fight by submission in the third round.

Sterling faced Johnny Eduardo on December 10, 2015, at UFC Fight Night 80. He won the fight via submission in the second round.

2016
Sterling next faced Bryan Caraway on May 29, 2016, at UFC Fight Night 88. Despite dominating the first round, Sterling began to tire and would go on to lose the following two rounds and lose via split decision.

Sterling was expected to face Raphael Assunção on December 9, 2016, at UFC Fight Night 102. However, Sterling pulled out of the fight on November 23 citing injury. Assunção was subsequently removed from the card.

2017
The bout with Assunção was rescheduled and took place on January 28, 2017, at UFC on Fox 23. Sterling lost the fight via split decision.

Sterling faced Augusto Mendes on April 15, 2017, at UFC on Fox 24. He won the fight by unanimous decision.

Sterling faced Renan Barão on July 29, 2017, at UFC 214. The fight was initially contracted to be contested at bantamweight, however on June 28, the CSAC announced that they would not license Barão to compete at that weight due to his struggle to make the required weight at UFC 177. The bout with Sterling proceeded as scheduled at a catchweight of 140 lbs. Sterling won the bout by unanimous decision.

Sterling was expected to face Rani Yahya on December 9, 2017, at UFC Fight Night 123. However, Yahya pulled out from the event on November 7, 2017, due to injury, and was replaced by Marlon Moraes. He lost the fight via KO in the first round.

2018
Sterling faced Brett Johns on April 21, 2018, at UFC Fight Night 128. He won the fight via unanimous decision.

Sterling faced Cody Stamann on September 8, 2018, at UFC 228. He won the fight via submission in the second round.

2019
Sterling faced Jimmie Rivera on February 17, 2019, at UFC on ESPN 1. He won the fight by unanimous decision.

Sterling faced Pedro Munhoz on June 8, 2019, at UFC 238. He won the fight by unanimous decision.

2020
Sterling faced Cory Sandhagen on June 6, 2020, at UFC 250 in a bout that UFC president Dana White confirmed to be a bantamweight title eliminator. He won the bout via submission in the first round. This win earned him his first Performance of the Night.

UFC Bantamweight Championship
Sterling was expected to face Petr Yan for the UFC Bantamweight Championship on December 12, 2020, at UFC 256. However, on November 22, it was announced the bout was scrapped from the UFC 256 card due to undisclosed reasons and the bout took place on March 6, 2021, at UFC 259. Sterling won the fight by disqualification due to an intentional illegal knee in the fourth round, becoming the new UFC Bantamweight Champion. He became the first fighter in UFC history to win a championship by disqualification.

A rematch with Yan was expected to take place on October 30, 2021, at UFC 267. However, on September 25, Sterling withdrew from the contest due to lingering neck issues from surgery. The pair was initially rescheduled to meet at UFC 272 on March 5, 2022, but the bout was pushed back to UFC 273 on April 9. Sterling won the close bout and defended the title via split decision. 11 of 18 MMA media outlets scored the bout for Sterling, while 5 scored it as a draw.

Sterling successfully defended his title against T.J. Dillashaw on October 22, 2022, at UFC 280. Sterling won the one-sided bout via TKO in the second round, resulting in Sterling's first stoppage by strikes in eight years.

Sterling is scheduled to face Henry Cejudo on May 6, 2023 at UFC 288.

Championships and accomplishments

Mixed martial arts
Ultimate Fighting Championship
 UFC Bantamweight Championship (One time, current)
 Two successful title defenses
 Performance of the Night (One time) 
 Tied (T.J. Dillashaw) for most wins in UFC Bantamweight division history (13)
 Tied (Merab Dvalishvili) for the longest win streak in UFC Bantamweight division history (8)
Cage Fury Fighting Championships
CFFC Bantamweight Championship (One time)
 Three successful title defenses
Ring of Combat
ROC Bantamweight Championship (One time)
MMAJunkie.com
2018 Submission of the Year vs. Cody Stamann
2020 June Submission of the Month vs. Cory Sandhagen
Cageside Press
2020 "Submission of the Year"  vs. Cory Sandhagen, tied with Khabib Nurmagomedov and A.J. McKee
World MMA Awards
2022 Comeback of the Year

Mixed martial arts record 

|-
|Win
|align=center|22–3
|T.J. Dillashaw
|TKO (punches)
|UFC 280
|
|align=center|2
|align=center|3:44
|Abu Dhabi, United Arab Emirates
|
|-
|Win
|align=center|21–3
|Petr Yan
|Decision (split)
|UFC 273
|
|align=center|5
|align=center|5:00
|Jacksonville, Florida, United States
|
|-
|Win
|align=center|20–3
|Petr Yan
|DQ (illegal knee)
|UFC 259
|
|align=center|4
|align=center|4:29
|Las Vegas, Nevada, United States
|
|-
|Win
|align=center|19–3
|Cory Sandhagen
|Submission (rear-naked choke)
|UFC 250
|
|align=center|1
|align=center|1:28
|Las Vegas, Nevada, United States
|
|-
|Win
|align=center|18–3
|Pedro Munhoz
|Decision (unanimous)
|UFC 238 
|
|align=center|3
|align=center|5:00
|Chicago, Illinois, United States
|
|-
|Win
|align=center|17–3
|Jimmie Rivera
|Decision (unanimous)
|UFC on ESPN: Ngannou vs. Velasquez 
|
|align=center|3
|align=center|5:00
|Phoenix, Arizona, United States
|
|-
|Win
|align=center|16–3
|Cody Stamann
|Submission (Suloev stretch)
|UFC 228 
|
|align=center|2
|align=center|3:42
|Dallas, Texas, United States
|
|- 
|Win
|align=center|15–3
|Brett Johns
|Decision (unanimous)
|UFC Fight Night: Barboza vs. Lee
|
|align=center|3
|align=center|5:00
|Atlantic City, New Jersey, United States
|
|- 
| Loss
|align=center| 14–3
|Marlon Moraes
|KO (knee)
|UFC Fight Night: Swanson vs. Ortega 
|
|align=center|1
|align=center|1:07
|Fresno, California, United States
|
|-
|Win
|align=center|14–2
|Renan Barão
|Decision (unanimous)
|UFC 214
|
|align=center|3
|align=center|5:00
|Anaheim, California, United States
|
|-
|Win
|align=center|13–2
|Augusto Mendes
|Decision (unanimous)
|UFC on Fox: Johnson vs. Reis
|
|align=center|3
|align=center|5:00
|Kansas City, Missouri, United States
|
|-
|Loss
|align=center|12–2
|Raphael Assunção
|Decision (split)
|UFC on Fox: Shevchenko vs. Peña
|
|align=center|3
|align=center|5:00
|Denver, Colorado, United States
|
|-
|Loss
|align=center| 12–1
|Bryan Caraway
|Decision (split)
|UFC Fight Night: Almeida vs. Garbrandt
|
|align=center|3
|align=center|5:00
|Las Vegas, Nevada, United States
|
|-
|Win
|align=center|12–0
|Johnny Eduardo
|Submission (guillotine choke)
|UFC Fight Night: Namajunas vs. VanZant
|
|align=center|2
|align=center|4:18
|Las Vegas, Nevada, United States
|
|-
|Win
|align=center|11–0
|Takeya Mizugaki
|Submission (arm-triangle choke)
|UFC on Fox: Machida vs. Rockhold 
|
|align=center|3
|align=center|2:11
|Newark, New Jersey, United States
|
|-
| Win
|align=center| 10–0
| Hugo Viana
| TKO (punches)
| UFC Fight Night: Cowboy vs. Miller
| 
|align=center| 3
|align=center| 3:50
|Atlantic City, New Jersey, United States
|
|-
| Win
|align=center| 9–0
| Cody Gibson
| Decision (unanimous)
| UFC 170
| 
|align=center| 3
|align=center| 5:00
|Las Vegas, Nevada, United States
| 
|-
| Win
|align=center| 8–0
| Joel Roberts
| Submission (rear-naked choke)
| CFFC 30: Sterling vs. Roberts
| 
|align=center| 1
|align=center| 1:49
|King of Prussia, Pennsylvania, United States
| 
|-
| Win
|align=center| 7–0
| Sidemar Honorio
| Submission (rear-naked choke)
| CFFC 16: Williams vs. Jacoby
| 
|align=center| 2
|align=center| 4:05
|Atlantic City, New Jersey, United States
| 
|-
| Win
|align=center| 6–0
| Casey Johnson
| Submission (rear-naked choke)
| CFFC 14: No Mercy
| 
|align=center| 3
|align=center| 2:11
|Atlantic City, New Jersey, United States
| 
|-
| Win
|align=center| 5–0
| Sean Santella
| Decision (unanimous)
| CFFC 11: Danger Zone!
| 
|align=center| 5
|align=center| 5:00
|Atlantic City, New Jersey, United States
| 
|-
| Win
|align=center| 4–0
| Evan Chmielski
| TKO (punches)
| CFFC 10: Black Eye
| 
|align=center| 1
|align=center| 4:58
|Atlantic City, New Jersey, United States
| 
|-
| Win
|align=center| 3–0
| Claudio Ledesma

| Decision (split)
| Ring of Combat 36
| 
|align=center| 3
|align=center| 5:00
|Atlantic City, New Jersey, United States
| 
|-
| Win
|align=center| 2–0
| Harley Leimbach
| Submission (rear-naked choke)
| EFC: Bragging Rights 2
| 
|align=center| 1
|align=center| 4:01
| Erie, Pennsylvania, United States
| 
|-
| Win
|align=center| 1–0
| Sergio da Silva
| Decision (unanimous)
| UCC 4: Supremacy
| 
|align=center| 3
|align=center| 5:00
| Morristown, New Jersey, United States
|

See also
 List of current UFC fighters
 List of male mixed martial artists

References

External links 

1989 births
Living people
American people of Jamaican descent
African-American Christians
African-American mixed martial artists
American male mixed martial artists
American male sport wrestlers
Jamaican male mixed martial artists
Jamaican male sport wrestlers
Mixed martial artists from New York (state)
Bantamweight mixed martial artists
Mixed martial artists utilizing collegiate wrestling
Mixed martial artists utilizing freestyle wrestling
Mixed martial artists utilizing Brazilian jiu-jitsu
American practitioners of Brazilian jiu-jitsu
Jamaican practitioners of Brazilian jiu-jitsu
People awarded a black belt in Brazilian jiu-jitsu
State University of New York at Cortland alumni
Morrisville State College alumni
Ultimate Fighting Championship male fighters
Ultimate Fighting Championship champions
21st-century African-American sportspeople
20th-century African-American people